William Horton Sr. (December 18, 1909 – June 26, 1973) was an American sailor. He competed in the Dragon event at the 1952 Summer Olympics.

References

External links
 

1909 births
1973 deaths
American male sailors (sport)
Olympic sailors of the United States
Sailors at the 1952 Summer Olympics – Dragon
Sportspeople from Los Angeles